Events from the year 1851 in art.

Events
 March – English sculptor Frederick Scott Archer makes public the wet plate collodion photographic process.
 May 1 – The Great Exhibition opens at Crystal Palace, London.  Works of art on display include the Tara Brooch, handicrafts and ornaments by the Sindhis, an electrotype of John Evan Thomas' sculpture Death of Tewdric Mawr, King of Gwent, and a demonstration by makers of Bristol blue glass.
 Pinacoteca Tosio Martinengo opens in Brescia, Italy.
 Missions Héliographiques established by Prosper Mérimée to photograph historical French architecture.

Works

 Edward Hodges Baily – Peel Memorial, Bury (sculpture)
 John Bell – sculptures at The Great Exhibition
 Andromeda
 The Eagle Slayer (cast iron)
 Una and the Lion
 Charles Allston Collins – Convent Thoughts
 Jean-Baptiste-Camille Corot – La Danse des Nymphes
 Jean-Léon Gérôme - Black Panther Stalking a Herd of Deer
 Francesco Hayez
 Antonietta Tarsis Basilico 
 Matilde Juva-Branca
 The Meditation (second version)
 William Holman Hunt – The Hireling Shepherd
 Sir Edwin Landseer
 Monarch of the Glen
 Scene from A Midsummer Night's Dream
 Frederick Richard Lee – Shattered Oak in Bedfordshire
 Emanuel Leutze – Washington Crossing the Delaware
 Daniel Maclise – Caxton Showing the First Specimen of His Printing to King Edward IV at the Almonry, Westminster
 John Jabez Edwin Mayall – The Lord's Prayer (daguerrotype)
 John Everett Millais
 Mariana
 The Return of the Dove to the Ark
 Karl Heinrich Möller – Athena Arms the Warrior (sculpture, Berlin)
 Soma Orlai Petrich – The Corpse of Louis II
 Richard Redgrave – The Outcast
 Dante Gabriel Rossetti – Beatrice Meeting Dante at a Marriage Feast, Denies him her Salutation
 Théophile Schuler – The Chariot of Death (painting, begun in 1848)
 Rebecca Solomon – The Governess
 John Thomas – Charity (sculpture)
 Franz Xaver Winterhalter – The First of May, 1851

Publications
 John Leech – The Comic History of Rome
 Edward Lear – Journal of a Landscape Painter in Albania
 John Ruskin – Pre-Raphaelitism

Births
 January 17 – A. B. Frost, American illustrator (died 1928)
 January 28 – Andreas Aubert, Norwegian art historian (died 1913)
 February 3 – Wilhelm Trübner, German realist painter (died 1917)
 April 19 – Đorđe Krstić, one of the leading three Serbian Realist painters (along with Uroš Predić and Paja Jovanović) (died 1907)
 July 23 – Peder Severin Krøyer, Norwegian painter (died 1909)
 October 2 – Francesco Paolo Michetti, Italian painter (died 1929)
 October 13 – Charles Sprague Pearce, American painter (died 1914)
 November 21 – Leslie Ward ("Spy"), English caricaturist (died 1922)
 December 20 – Thérèse Schwartze, Dutch portrait painter (died 1918)

Deaths
 January 9
 Michel Martin Drolling, French painter of history and portraits (born 1789)
 Johannes Hermanus Koekkoek, Dutch painter and draughtsman (born 1778)
 January 27 – John James Audubon, Haitian-born American naturalist and painter (born 1785)
 March 10 – Abraham Constantin, Swiss enamel painter (born 1785)
 April 7 – Henry Thomas Alken, English engraver, illustrator and sporting artist (born 1785)
 April 8 – John Henning, Scottish sculptor and medallist (born 1771)
 July 10 – Louis Daguerre, French inventor of daguerreotype photography (born 1787)
 July 11 – Benjamin Duterrau, French painter and engraver (born 1768)
 October 25 – Giorgio Pullicino, Maltese painter and architect (born 1779)
 October 29 – William Wyon, English chief engraver at the Royal Mint (born 1795)
 November – Willis Buell, American politician and portrait painter (born 1790)
 December 6 – John Buckler, English draughtsman and engraver (born 1770)
 December 19 – J. M. W. Turner, English Romantic landscape painter, watercolourist and printmaker (born 1775)

References

 
Years of the 19th century in art
1850s in art